A list of animated feature films first released in 1981.

See also
 List of animated television series of 1981

References

 Feature films
1981
1981-related lists